

People
Korin may refer to:
 Halyna Korin (1926–2014), Ukrainian-born Australian musician
 Korin Louise Visocchi (born 1982), Detroit musician and artisan
 Ogata Kōrin (尾形光琳1658–1716), Japanese painter of the Rinpa school, often referred to as just Kōrin
 Pavel Korin (1892–1967), Russian painter and art restorer

Other
 Korin Japanese Trading Company, a kitchen knife brand
 Korin, a fictional character in Dragon Ball

See also
 Corin, a given name
 Korina (disambiguation)
 Korine, a surname